Sechura–Catacao is a proposed connection between the small Catacaoan language family of Peru and the language isolate Sechura (Sek). The languages are extremely poorly known, but Kaufman (1990) finds the connection convincing, Campbell (2012) persuasive.

External relationships
Kaufman (1994: 64) groups Leco and Sechura–Catacao together as part of a proposed Macro-Lecoan family.

Tovar (1961), partly based on Schmidt (1926), classifies Sechura–Catacao together with the Chimuan languages in his Yunga–Puruhá family.

Vocabulary
Loukotka (1968) lists the following basic vocabulary items.

{| class="wikitable sortable"
! gloss !! Sechura !! Catacao !! Colan
|-
! man
| rekla || aszat || yatadlam
|-
! water
| xoto || yup || yúp
|-
! fire
| morot || guanararak || hayur
|-
! sun
| yóro || nap || turi nap
|-
! moon
| ñangru || nam || nag
|-
! bird
| yaibab || yeya || yaiau
|-
! fish
| xuma || l'as || l'as
|-
! head
| te-uma ||  || 
|-
! foot
| lava ||  || 
|}

Comparative word list of Sechura, Colan, and Catacao from Loukotka (1949):

Notes
(Sp.) = Spanish loanword (excluded)

Sources used by Loukotka (1949)
Sechura: Buchwald (1919)
Manuscript by Martínez Compañón from the 1700s

{| class="wikitable sortable"
! French gloss (original) !! English gloss (translated) !! Sechura !! Kolan !! Katakao
|-
| animal || animal || animblà || (Sp.) || (Sp.)
|-
| arbre || tree || nusuču || (Sp.) || čiguasam
|-
| boire || drink || tutuk || kum || konekuk
|-
| ciel || sky || kučuk yor || kutuk nap || (Sp.)
|-
| cœur || heart || čusiupunma || ñessinim || ñiesiñičim
|-
| corps || body || kuerpokči || (Sp.) || (Sp.)
|-
| douleur || pain || punuk || masik || masik
|-
| eau || water || tutú || yup || yup
|-
| étoiles || stars || čúpčúp || čupučup || (Sp.)
|-
| femme || woman || kuktum || pim || pičim
|-
| feu || fire || morot || huyur || guanararak
|-
| fille || daughter || ñosñi || hikum || ykučim kapuk
|-
| fils || son || ñosñi || hikum || ykučim
|-
| fleur || flower || florak || (Sp.) || alhuaka
|-
| fleuve || river || tuxut || yup || turuyup
|-
| frère || brother || sikanñi || puam || puačim
|-
| fruit || fruit || (Sp.) || (Sp.) || (Sp.)
|-
| gai || happy || otmuk || čagasiñ || (Sp.)
|-
| herbe || grass || unñiókól || aguakol || taguakol
|-
| homme || man || sukda || yatadlam || aszat
|-
| lune || moon || ñangru || nag || nam
|-
| manger || eat || unuk || agua || aguačim
|-
| mer || sea || roro || amum || amaum
|-
| mère || mother || ñiña || nun || ničim
|-
| mort || dead || laktukno || dlakati || ynataklakatu
|-
| oiseau || bird || yaibab || yaiau || yeya
|-
| ondes || waves || kaph || llamas || (Sp.)
|-
| os || bone || ruño || dladlapiram || lalapečen
|-
| père || father || xači || mam || (Sp.)
|-
| pleurer || cry || nik || ñar || ñarakñakitutin
|-
| pluie || rain || purir || nug || guayakinum
|-
| poisson || fish || xum || llas || llas
|-
| rameau || branch || (Sp.) || yabitiram || yabike
|-
| régner || reign || busuk || čañar || čañak
|-
| sœur || sister || bapueñi || purum || puručim
|-
| soleil || sun || yóro || turinap || nap
|-
| terre || earth || lokt || dlurum || durum
|-
| tronc || trunk || fukú || tukuram || taksikás
|-
| vent || wind || fik || kuiat ñap || vik
|-
| viande || meat || kolt || (Sp.) || kkol
|}

References

Proposed language families
Indigenous languages of the Americas